is a 1984 Japanese post-apocalyptic anime fantasy film written and directed by Hayao Miyazaki, based on his 1982 manga. It was animated by Topcraft for Tokuma Shoten and Hakuhodo, and distributed by Toei Company. Joe Hisaishi, in his first collaboration with Miyazaki, composed the score. The film stars the voices of Sumi Shimamoto, Gorō Naya, Yōji Matsuda, Yoshiko Sakakibara and Iemasa Kayumi. Taking place in a post-nuclear futuristic world, the film tells the story of Nausicaä (Shimamoto), the young teenage princess of the Valley of the Wind. She becomes embroiled in a struggle with Tolmekia, a kingdom that tries to use an ancient weapon to eradicate a jungle full of giant mutant insects.

Nausicaä of the Valley of the Wind was released in Japan on 11 March 1984. A heavily edited adaptation of the film created by Manson International, Warriors of the Wind, was released in the United States and other markets throughout the mid-to-late 1980s. The Manson cut was derided by Miyazaki and eventually replaced in circulation by an uncut, redubbed version produced by Walt Disney Pictures in 2005. Though it was made before Studio Ghibli was founded, it is often considered a Ghibli work, and was released as part of the Studio Ghibli Collection DVD and Blu-ray range. The film received critical acclaim, with praise being directed at the story, themes, characters and animation. It is the highest ranked Japanese anime in a survey published by the Japan's Agency for Cultural Affairs in 2007.

Plot

One thousand years have passed since the Seven Days of Fire, an apocalyptic war that destroyed civilization and created the vast Toxic Jungle, a poisonous forest swarming with giant mutant insects. In the kingdom of the Valley of the Wind, a prophecy predicts a saviour "clothed in blue robe, descending onto a golden field". Nausicaä, the 16-year-old princess of the Valley of the Wind, explores the jungle and communicates with its creatures, including the gigantic, trilobite-like armored Ohm. She hopes to understand the jungle and find a way for it and humans to co-exist.

One day at dawn, a massive cargo aircraft from the kingdom of Tolmekia crashes in the Valley despite Nausicaä's attempt to save it. Its sole survivor, Princess Lastelle of Pejite, pleads with Nausicaä to destroy the cargo and dies. The cargo is an embryo of a Giant Warrior, one of the lethal, gargantuan humanoid bioweapons that caused the Seven Days of Fire. Tolmekia, a military state, seized the embryo and Lastelle from Pejite, but their plane was attacked by insects and crashed. One of the insects emerges wounded from the wreckage and poises to attack, but Nausicaä uses a bullroarer to calm it and guides it away from the village.

Soon after, Tolmekian troops, led by Princess Kushana, invade the Valley, execute Nausicaä's father and capture the embryo. Enraged, Nausicaä assaults and kills several Tolmekian soldiers and is about to be overwhelmed when the Valley's swordsmaster, Lord Yupa, soothes the belligerents. Kushana plans to mature the Giant Warrior and use it to burn the Toxic Jungle. Yupa discovers a secret garden of jungle plants reared by Nausicaä; according to her findings, plants that grow in clean soil and water are not toxic, but the jungle's soil has been tainted by pollution.

Kushana leaves for the Tolmekian capital with Nausicaä and five hostages from the Valley, but a Pejite interceptor shoots down the Tolmekian airships carrying them. Nausicaä, Kushana and the hostages crash-land in the jungle, disturbing several Ohms, which Nausicaä soothes. She leaves to rescue the Pejite pilot Asbel, twin brother of Princess Lastelle, but both crash through a stratum of quicksand into a non-toxic area below the Toxic Jungle. Nausicaä realizes that the jungle plants purify the polluted topsoil, producing clean water and soil underground.

Nausicaä and Asbel return to Pejite but find it ravaged by insects. A band of survivors explains that they lured the insects to eradicate the Tolmekians, and are doing the same to the Valley. They capture Nausicaä to prevent her from warning the Valley, but with the help of Asbel, his mother, and a number of sympathizers, Nausicaä escapes on her glider. Flying home, she finds two Pejite soldiers baiting thousands of Ohms into the Valley using a wounded baby Ohm. The people of the Valley take shelter while the Tolmekians deploy tanks and the Giant Warrior, but tank-fire does not deter the Ohms, and the Giant Warrior, hatched prematurely, disintegrates.

Nausicaä liberates the baby Ohm and gains its trust. She and the Ohm stand before the herd but are run over. The Ohms calm down and use their golden tentacles to resuscitate her. Nausicaä, her dress drenched blue with Ohm blood, walks atop golden Ohm tentacles as through golden fields, fulfilling the savior prophecy. The Ohms and Tolmekians leave the Valley, and the Pejites remain with the Valley people, helping them rebuild. Deep underneath the Toxic Jungle, a non-toxic tree sprouts.

Voice cast

Production
Hayao Miyazaki made his credited directorial debut in 1979 with The Castle of Cagliostro, a film which was a distinct departure from the antics of the Lupin III franchise, but still went on to receive the Ōfuji Noburō Award at the 1979 Mainichi Film Awards. Although Cagliostro was not a box office success, Toshio Suzuki, editor of the magazine Animage, was impressed by the film and encouraged Miyazaki to produce works for Animage's publisher, Tokuma Shoten. Miyazaki's film ideas were rejected, and Tokuma asked him to do a manga: this led to the creation of Nausicaä of the Valley of the Wind. Miyazaki began writing and drawing the manga in 1981, and it quickly became Animage's most popular feature. Hideo Ogata and Yasuyoshi Tokuma, the founders of Animage and Tokuma Shoten respectively, encouraged Miyazaki to work on a film adaptation. Miyazaki initially refused, but agreed on the condition that he could direct.

In the early stages, Isao Takahata, credited as executive producer, reluctantly joined the project even before the animation studio was chosen. An outside studio to produce the film was needed because Tokuma Shoten did not own an animation studio: Miyazaki and Takahata chose the minor studio Topcraft. The production studio's work was known to both Miyazaki and Takahata and was chosen because its artistic talent could transpose the sophisticated atmosphere of the manga to the film. On 31 May 1983, work began on the pre-production of the film. Miyazaki encountered difficulties in creating the screenplay, with only sixteen chapters of the manga to work with. Miyazaki would take elements of the story and refocus the narrative and characters to the Tolmekian invasion of Nausicaä's homeland. Takahata would enlist the experimental and minimalist composer Joe Hisaishi to do the score for the film.

In August, the animation work began on the film and was produced by animators hired for the one film and paid per frame. One notable animator was Hideaki Anno, a founding member of Gainax who among later works wrote and directed Neon Genesis Evangelion. Anno was assigned to draw the challenging God Warrior's attack sequence, which according to Toshio Suzuki is a "high point in the film". The film was released on 11 March 1984, with a production schedule of only nine months and with a budget equivalent to $1 million.

Themes
Miyazaki's work on Nausicaä of the Valley of the Wind was inspired by a range of works including Ursula K. Le Guin's Earthsea, Brian Aldiss's Hothouse, Isaac Asimov's Nightfall, and J. R. R. Tolkien's The Lord of the Rings. Dani Cavallaro also suggests inspiration from The Lady who Loved Insects folktale, and the works of William Golding. Nausicaä, the character, was inspired in name and personality by Homer's Phaeacian princess in the Odyssey. According to a number of reviewers, Frank Herbert's science fiction novel Dune (1965) was one of the inspirations for the film's post-apocalyptic world. Some online commentators have dubbed it "anime's answer to Dune". Miyazaki's imagination was sparked by the mercury poisoning of Minamata Bay and how nature responded and thrived in a poisoned environment, using it to create the polluted world depicted in the film. Kyle Anderson of Nerdist describes the film's setting as a steampunk post-apocalypse, while Philip Boyes of Eurogamer describes the technology in Nausicaä and Castle in the Sky as dieselpunk.

The most prominent themes are the anti-war and environmental focus of the film. Nausicaä, the heroine, believes in the value of life regardless of its form and through her actions stops a war. Loy and Goodhew state there is no evil portrayed in the film, but the Buddhist roots of evil: greed, ill will and delusion. Fear is what drives the conflicts, the fear of the poisoned forest results in greed and resentment. Nausicaä, in addition to being a transformative force, leads people to understand and respect nature, which is portrayed as welcoming, spiritual, and restorative for those who enter it peacefully. Ian DeWeese-Boyd agrees, "Her commitment to love and understanding—even to the point of death—transforms the very nature of the conflict around her and begins to dispel the distorting visions that have brought it about."

The film was released in 1984, with a recommendation from the World Wide Fund for Nature (WWF). On 30 July 1995, a subtitled version of the film was screened at the Institute of Contemporary Arts in London, as part of the "Building Bridges" film festival, marking the fiftieth anniversary of the atomic bombings of Hiroshima and Nagasaki. In her 25 March 2013 presentation at Colorado College, on "Tapestries of Apocalypse: From Angers to 'Nausicaa' and Beyond", Dr. Susan J. Napier places the film, and in particular the tapestry depicted underneath the opening credits, within the tradition of artistic representation of apocalypses and apocalyptic visions. She explores the role such expressions play in understanding apocalyptic events and post-event recovery.

Releases
The film was released by Toei Company on March 11, 1984.

In Japan, the film was released on VHS and Laserdisc in 1985 by Tokuma Shoten's "Animage Video" imprint. It was also included on the Ghibli ga Ippai: Studio Ghibli Complete LD Collection boxset, released by Tokuma Shoten in August 1996. The VHS was reissued as the third volume of Buena Vista Home Entertainment Japan's "Ghibli ga Ippai" imprint, on September 19, 1997.

Buena Vista released the film on three DVD sets, with a regular DVD and figure set released on 19 November 2003 and a collectors set following on 7 December 2003. By 2003, Nausicaä had sold 1.77million VHS and DVD units in Japan. Walt Disney Studios Japan released the film on Blu-ray on July 14, 2010.

Warriors of the Wind
Manson International and Showmen, Inc. produced a 95-minute English-dubbed adaptation of the film, titled Warriors of the Wind, which was released theatrically in the United States by New World Pictures on 13 June 1985, followed by a VHS release in December 1985. In the late 1980s, Vestron Video would re-release the film in the UK and First Independent Video would re-release it again in 1993, with another minute cut from the film. The voice actors and actresses were not credited and were not informed of the film's plotline, and the film was heavily edited to market it as a children's action-adventure film, although the film received a PG rating just like Disney's later English dub. Consequently, part of the film's narrative meaning was lost: some of the environmentalist themes were diluted as was the main subplot of the Ohmu, altered to turn them into aggressive enemies. Most of the characters' names were changed, including the titular character who became Princess Zandra. The United States poster and VHS cover featured a cadre of male characters who are not in the film, riding the resurrected God Warrior—including a still-living Warrior shown briefly in a flashback. Approximately 22 minutes of scenes were cut for the film's North American release.

Dissatisfied with Warriors of the Wind, Miyazaki eventually adopted a strict "no-edits" clause for further foreign releases of the company's films. On hearing that Miramax co-chairman Harvey Weinstein would attempt to edit Princess Mononoke to make it more marketable, Toshio Suzuki sent an authentic katana with a simple message: "No cuts". Warriors of the Wind also prompted Miyazaki to allow translator Toren Smith of Studio Proteus to create an official, faithful translation of the Nausicaä manga for Viz Media.

English re-releases
On 18 October 2003, Cindy and Donald Hewitt, the scriptwriters of Walt Disney Pictures' English dubs of Spirited Away and Porco Rosso, announced that a more faithful English version of Nausicaä was in pre-production at Disney, and that Patrick Stewart and Uma Thurman had been cast. Natalie Portman was originally intended to voice Nausicaä, but Alison Lohman was eventually cast in the role. The dub was directed by Disney executive Rick Dempsey.

Nausicaä was released on DVD by Buena Vista Home Entertainment on February 22, 2005, for Region 1. This DVD includes both Disney's English dub and the Japanese audio track with English subtitles. Optimum Home Entertainment released the film in Region 2 and the Region 4 DVD is distributed by Madman Entertainment. A remastered Blu-ray sourced from a 6K filmscan was released on 14 July 2010 in Japan. It includes an uncompressed Japanese LPCM stereo track, the Disney-produced English dub and English subtitles. On 18 October 2010, a Blu-ray version was released in Region B by Optimum Home Entertainment. The film was released on Blu-ray in the United States and Canada on March 8, 2011, by Walt Disney Studios Home Entertainment. The Blu-ray earned $334,473 in retail sales during its first week of release in the United States. GKIDS and Shout! Factory re-issued the film on Blu-ray and DVD on October 31, 2017, along with Castle in the Sky. A Limited Edition steelbook release of the film's DVD and Blu-ray was released in the United States on 25 August 2020.

Other language releases
Spain first released two versions of the cut film, both called Guerreros del Viento ("Warriors of the Wind") with the first in 1987 and again in 1991, and then a version of the original uncut film under the Nausicaä del Valle del Viento title in 2010. France has had both versions of the movie appear with two cut versions named La Princesse des Étoiles ("The Princess of the Stars") and Le vaisseau fantôme ("The Ghost Ship"): the uncut film had a regular and collector's DVD set released on 18 April 2007. In Germany UFA released the 86-minute long cut version on VHS as Sternenkrieger (literally "Star Warriors") in 1986 and Universum Anime released the uncut DVD release on 5 September 2005. The 2007 Hungarian release, titled Nauszika - A szél harcosai ("Nausicaä - The Warriors of the Wind") is uncut despite the title's reference. The Korean DVD release of the uncut film was on 3 March 2004. China has had three releases of Nausicaä: the first on Video CD and two DVD releases. In Italy the film, titled Nausicaä della Valle del vento, was first aired uncut on Rai 1 on 6 January 1987 with a first dub, but this version was reaired only a few times and then never officially published; a planned DVD release around 2003 by Buena Vista Italia was eventually cancelled. Nausicaä had a theatrical distribution and a DVD release with a new dub by Lucky Red in 2015.

Reception

Box office
In Japan, the film grossed about 1.48billion at the box office, earning 742million in distributor rental income. Its 2020 re-release grossed a further $6,393,174 in Japan, adding up to  grossed in Japan.

Overseas, the film grossed $1,720,214 from theatrical releases in seven countries between 2006 and 2017, including $1,521,343 in France alone. Combined, the film grossed  worldwide.

In terms of box office admissions, the film sold 914,767 tickets in Japan up until 2006 and 342,235 tickets in Europe, adding up to at least  tickets sold in Japan (not including the 2020 re-release) and Europe.

Critical response
Nausicaä of the Valley of the Wind received critical acclaim. The film is frequently ranked among the best animated films in Japan, and is seen by critics as a seminal influence on the development of anime, as the film's success led to the foundation of Miyazaki's Studio Ghibli and several other anime studios. Theron Martin of Anime News Network praised the film for its character designs, as well as Hayao Miyazaki's direction and Joe Hisaishi's score. He also said that the film "deserves a place on any short list of all-time classic anime movies." Common Sense Media, which serves to inform parents about media for children, rated the film positively and cited its good role models and positive messages, but also cautioned parents about its dramatic setting and violent scenes.  At Metacritic, the film has a weighted average score of 86 out of 100 based on 7 critics, indicating "universal acclaim". Helen McCarthy in 500 Essential Anime Movies praised the animation techniques of Miyazaki, stating that "the real strength of this film is the script, packed with incident, excitement and passion, and the soundtrack" of Joe Hisaishi.

Final Fantasy creator Hironobu Sakaguchi has cited the manga and film as an influence on his video game series; the horseclaws in the film were used as an inspiration for the Chocobos in the games. Sega's Yukio Futatsugi has cited the film an inspiration for his 1995 rail shooter Panzer Dragoon, as he was an avid fan of Miyazaki's work. Numerous games have used Ohmu-like creatures, assumed to be reference to the film including Metal Slug 3, Cyber Core, and Viewpoint. The game Crystalis, known in Japan as God Slayer: Haruka Tenkū no Sonata (ゴッド・スレイヤー はるか天空のソナタ), shares common elements with the film, including an insect that resembles an Ohmu. The film Star Wars: The Force Awakens (2015) also shares common elements with the film, including similarities between the protagonists Nausicaa and Rey (such as their personalities and headwear), and a number of strikingly similar scenes.

Manga author Katsura Hoshino regarded it as her favorite anime film to the point of having watched it multiple times when she was young. In 2001, the Japanese magazine Animage elected Nausicaä of the Valley of the Wind the 43rd best anime production of all time. It was the highest-ranking film in a 2006 poll of the greatest animations conducted at the Japan Media Arts Festival, voted by 80,000 attendees. The film was named 2nd Greatest Japanese Animated Film of All Time by Japanese film magazine Kinema Junpo in 2009.

Gliders

Various gliders are seen in the film and the protagonist, Nausicaä, uses a jet-assisted one-person glider-shaped machine with folding wings. According to the accompanying film book released in Japan, the glider is called , the German word meaning gull. An official scale model lists it as having an approximate wingspan of 5.8 meters (1/20 model measured to be 29 cm), while the design notes indicate it has a mass of only 12 kg. In 2004, the Japanese-led OpenSky Aircraft Project began attempts to build a real-life, working personal jet glider based on the glider from the film. Two full-size gliders with no power source carrying the code name M01 and M02, with a half-sized jet-powered remote-controlled mock-up called moewe 1/2, were built. The designer and tester of the project refused the official endorsement of the project by Studio Ghibli and Hayao Miyazaki, noting that he did not want to cause trouble for them if an accident occurred. A jet powered version (registration number JX0122) was finally able to take off under its own power for the first time on 3 September 2013.

Soundtracks

The film's score was composed by Joe Hisaishi, while the titular theme song "Kaze no Tani no Naushika" was written by Takashi Matsumoto, composed by Haruomi Hosono and sung by Narumi Yasuda. Additionally, the song "Nausicaä's Requiem" was performed by the then-four-year-old Mai Fujisawa, Joe Hisaishi's daughter, who has also collaborated with Studio Ghibli on the vocal album for Kiki's Delivery Service and the image album for Ponyo on the Cliff by the Sea. Numerous soundtracks and albums relating to the film have been released.

Other media

Manga

Miyazaki's manga version of Nausicaä was written over a period of 12 years, with breaks taken to work on Studio Ghibli films. Serialized in Tokuma Shoten's Animage magazine, the first chapter was published in February 1982 and the last chapter in March 1994. Miyazaki adapted and altered the work for the film because only sixteen chapters of the manga were written at the time of the film's production. The manga would continue to be produced until the seventh and final book was released on 15 January 1995. The English localization was initially done by Toren Smith and Dana Lewis of Studio Proteus. After Miyazaki resumed production of the manga, Viz Media chose a new team and continued to release the rest of manga.

Video games
Three video games were released based on the manga and the film, all of which were developed by Technopolis Soft and published by Technopolis Soft and Tokuma Shoten and are released in 1984 on popular Japanese computer systems. The first game, Nausicaä's Close Call, also known as Nausicaä in the Nick of Time, (ナウシカ危機一髪, Naushika Kiki Ippatsu) is a Japanese shoot 'em up video game developed and published by Technopolis Soft for the NEC PC-6001. The second game, Nausicaä of the Valley of the Wind and known by its title screen as Nausicaä Adventure Game (風の谷のナウシカ, Kaze no Tani no Naushika), is an adventure game developed by Technopolis Soft for the NEC PC-8801. The third game, Never Forget to Nausicaä Game Forever (忘れじのナウシカ・ゲーム, Wasure ji no Naushika Gemu) for the MSX is the most well-known of the releases and has been frequently and erroneously referred to as a game where the player kills the Ohmu. These games signaled the end of video game adaptations for Hayao Miyazaki's films. The only other games based on Miyazaki films were the LaserDisc arcade game Cliff Hanger and the MSX2 platform-adventure game Lupin III: The Castle of Cagliostro, both of which were based on The Castle of Cagliostro. Luke Plunkett describes these "two awful adaptations" as the reason Miyazaki does not allow further video game adaptations of his films.

Other
An art book, was released by Tokuma Shoten on 20 June 1984. It contains artwork during the early stages of production of the film and commentary of assistant director Kazuyoshi Katayama.  was released by Tokuma Shoten on 5 September 1995. The art book contains artwork of the manga in watercolor, examples of storyboards for the film, autographed pictures by Hayao Miyazaki and interviews on the birth of Nausicaä. The book has been translated in English and French. Two bunkobon volumes containing the story boards were released, on 31 March 1984. In 2001, the Nausicaä storyboards were re-released, bundled into a single, larger, volume as part 1 of the Studio Ghibli Story boards collection. A selection of layout designs for the film was also incorporated in the Studio Ghibli Layout Designs exhibition tour, which started in the Museum of Contemporary Art Tokyo (28 July 2008 to 28 September 2008) and subsequently travelled to different museums around Japan and Asia, concluding in the Fukuoka Asian Art Museum (12 October 2013 to 26 January 2014). The exhibition catalogues contain annotated reproductions of the displayed artwork. Tokuma Shoten released a film comic, in four volumes, one each week from 20 November 1990 to 20 December 1990. A two-volume children's version was released on 31 March 1998. A kabuki play adaptation, covering the events of the movie, was performed in December 2019.

Notes

References

Further reading

Hairston, Marc (2010) "Miyazaki's Nausicaä of the Valley of the Wind: Manga into Anime and Its Reception" in Johnson-Woods, Toni (e.d.) Manga: An Anthology of Global and Cultural Perspectives Continuum International Publishing Group 
Napier, Susan J. (2005) Anime: From Akira to Howl's Moving Castle Palgrave Macmillan

External links

Review of Warriors of the Wind

Entry in The Encyclopedia of Science Fiction

Nausicaä of the Valley of the Wind
1984 anime films
1984 films
1980s fantasy adventure films
1980s Japanese-language films
1980s science fiction adventure films
Adventure anime and manga
Animated adventure films
Animated coming-of-age films
Animated films set in the future
Animated post-apocalyptic films
Anime films based on manga
Dieselpunk
Dieselpunk films
Environmental films
Films about princesses
Films about royalty
Films directed by Hayao Miyazaki
Films scored by Joe Hisaishi
Japanese adult animated films
Japanese animated fantasy films
Japanese animated science fiction films
Japanese aviation films
Japanese fantasy adventure films
Japanese post-apocalyptic films
Philosophical anime and manga
Studio Ghibli animated films
Toei Company films
Topcraft